Paján is a town in the Manabí province of Ecuador. It is the seat of the  Paján Canton.

Sources 
 www.inec.gov.ec

Populated places in Manabí Province